Great Hill Cemetery is a cemetery in Seymour, Connecticut, also known as Hookman's cemetery. The site was established in the 18th century, and it is still active today. It is located in a section of woods known as Great Hill.

References

External links
 
 Great Hill Cemetery at Oxford Past

Seymour, Connecticut
Cemeteries in New Haven County, Connecticut